Beim is a surname. Notable people with the surname include:

 George Beim (born 1942), American association football player and coach
 James Beim (born 1980), English polo player
 Tom Beim (born 1975), English rugby union football player
 Valeri Beim (born 1950), Austrian chess grandmaster and author